Coming Forth by Day is a studio album by American jazz singer Cassandra Wilson. The album was released on  via Legacy Recordings label.

Background
The album is a homage to legendary jazz vocalist Billie Holiday to commemorate the 100th anniversary of the singer's birth. The album includes 11 cover versions of famous jazz standards associated with Holiday and an original composition written by Cassandra Wilson—"Last Song (For Lester)"—imagined to be a heartbreaking final message from Holiday to her musical love, Lester Young. Wilson explained: "Coming Forth by Day is a homage dedicated to the beauty, power, and genius of Billie Holiday. A collection of musical spells, prescriptions for navigating the dubious myths surrounding her life and times, this record is a vehicle for the re-emergence of Billie’s songbook in the 21st century."

Reception

Stephen Thomas Erlewine of AllMusic stated, "Perhaps the pairing of Cassandra Wilson and Billie Holiday carries a whiff of inevitability, but there's nothing predictable about Coming Forth by Day. Released to coincide with Holiday's centennial in 2015, Coming Forth by Day explicitly celebrates Lady Day by drawing upon standards she sang in addition to songs she wrote, but Wilson deliberately sidesteps the conventional by hiring Nick Launay as a producer. As a result of his work with Nick Cave, Launay mastered a certain brand of spooky Americana, something that comes in handy with the Holiday catalog, but Coming Forth by Day is never too thick with murk. It luxuriates in its atmosphere, sometimes sliding into a groove suggesting smooth '70s soul, often handsomely evoking a cinematic torch song -- moods that complement each other and suggest Holiday's work without replicating it. This is a neat trick: such flexibility suggests how adaptable Holiday's songbook is while underscoring the imagination behind Wilson's interpretations. Certainly, Launay deserves credit for his painterly production, but the success of Coming Forth by Day belongs entirely to Wilson, who proves that she's an heir to Holiday's throne by never once imitating her idol."

Christopher Loudon of JazzTimes wrote, "Though it’s disheartening to realize that even an artist as eminent as Cassandra Wilson had to turn to PledgeMusic to fund her centenary salute to Billie Holiday, it’s best to set aside such state-of-things ponderings and focus on the outcome. Which is, in a word, exquisite. It’s also clever, insightful and, though utterly respectful to Holiday as source and touchstone, strikingly original." Writing for DownBeat, Bobby Reed commented, "This disc, which includes 11 songs recorded by Billie Holiday, functions as an admirable tribute, but it doesn’t sound like Lady Day. Wilson employs her own husky, occasionally hushed singing style, not attempting to re-create Holiday’s famous vocal inflections—and certainly not copying her arrangements. Instead, Wilson assembled a stellar, “outside the box” ensemble to interpret this material for a new generation of listeners."

John Fordham of The Guardian noted, "Singer Jose James’ recent tribute to Billie Holiday saw a fine singer and a hip jazz trio sprinkling personal magic on timeless songs with careful respect. Cassandra Wilson’s angle on Holiday is very different: a radical, big-production remake of the great vocalist’s music with the rhythm section from Nick Cave's Bad Seeds giving the repertoire a thick-textured, abstract blues-rock feel, while a luxurious strings section embraces the ballads." In his review for the Santa Barbara Independent, Charles Donelan wrote, "The album reveals yet another aspect of this visionary artist’s immense talent, as Wilson ventures into the orchestral territory mapped out by Arcade Fire, with her sainted muse Billie Holiday by her side."

Track listing

Personnel
Band
 Cassandra Wilson – vocals, guitar
 Kevin Breit – acoustic and electric guitar, banjo, loops
 Jon Cowherd – piano, organ
 Martyn P. Casey – bass
 Thomas Wydler – drums, percussion
 Robby Marshall – woodwinds, melodica
 Ming Vauze - guitar string, Loops (1, 10, 12)
 T Bone Burnett – baritone guitar (2, 4, 7)
 Nick Zinner – additional guitar and loops (4, 8–10, 12) 
 Eric Gorfain – violin with echos (3, 5, 8, 10, 11), string arrangements (3, 5, 8, 10), notes extended (4)
 The Section Quartet (Eric Gorfain, Daphne Chen, Lauren Chipman, Richard Dodd) - string quartet (3, 5, 8, 10)
 Van Dyke Parks – string arrangements (4, 6)
 Van Dyke Parks Orchestra (4, 6)
Production
 Nick Launay – producer, recording and mix, liner notes
 Ed Gerrard - co-producer
 Atom Greenspan - assistant producer and recording engineer
 Bernie Grundman - mastering
 Sherry Beth Mounce - project coordinator
 Frank Harkins - art direction, design
 Mark Seliger - photography

Charts

References

2015 albums
Cassandra Wilson albums
Legacy Recordings albums
Albums produced by Nick Launay
Vocal jazz albums